A metaphor is an analogy between two objects or ideas, conveyed by using a word instead of another word.

Metaphor can also refer to:

Conceptual metaphor, metaphors in cognitive linguistics, understanding one idea or conceptual domain in terms of another
Interface metaphor, metaphors in computer science, for example an icon of a filing cabinet for "filestore"
Metaphor: The Tree of Utah, a sculpture
"Metaphor", a song by In Flames from their album Reroute to Remain
"Metaphors", a poem by Sylvia Plath
"The Metaphor", a short story by Budge Wilson
 Metaphor (designers), a London-based design firm founded in 2000
 Metaphor Computer Systems, producer of an advanced combined hardware/software offering